Jamie Kimmett is a Christian music singer-songwriter signed to Provident Label Group under Sony.

Career 

Jamie Kimmett was born in Scotland. He grew up listening to artists like Michael Jackson, Stevie Wonder, and John Mayer. While studying to be a pastor in the UK, Kimmett decided to head to Nashville to pursue a Christian music career. Within a few weeks he was signed to Provident Label Group.

Kimmett has since toured with artists including Zach Williams, Matt Maher, Casting Crowns, and For King & Country. He co-wrote four songs with Toto's Steve Porcaro on his 2016 solo album Someday/Somehow, performing on the tracks "She's So Shy" and "Face of a Girl". He released his debut single, "Prize Worth Fighting For" on 14 December 2018. The song became his first Billboard charting song, reaching #10 on Christian Airplay.

Discography

Singles

Extended plays

References

External links 

Official website

Living people
British performers of Christian music
Year of birth missing (living people)